The 1960 Writers Guild of America strike was a labor dispute held by both Writers Guilds of America (WGAW and WGAE), against the Association of Motion Picture Producers.  It lasted for 146 days (from January 16 until June 10, 1960, with network writers joining mid-March, although an agreement between the involved parties was signed two days later after the strike), making it the second longest strike ever held by both unions by just one week less than the 1988 writers strike. This dispute was meant to raise concerns about broadcast royalties for films that air on television.

For a time, the actors were on strike at the same time, but they had returned to work before the writers reached a compromise with the film companies.

Seven of the eight major studios have reached an agreement:
 Allied Artists
 Columbia
 MGM
 Paramount
 Twentieth-Century Fox
 Walt Disney
 Warner Bros.
The eighth, Universal International, had reached an agreement before the strike began.  The settlement included having the studios pay into the writers' pension and health funds in the amount of $600,000.  They also agreed to give 5% of the studio's income from pre-1960 movies that air on television.  On post-1960 movies, writers got 2% of income.  If the film was shown on pay TV, they would not receive additional income.  The minimum rates were also increased to $350 a week and writers would get a 10% raise for the first two years and then 5% for the next year and a half.

For television writers, minimum wages increased 100 percent for the first two years and 100 for the next two.  Writers for low-budget half-hour shows would get $935 instead of $850.  High budget writers would get $1,200 instead of $1,100.  Writers would get a 4% royalty domestically and internationally on all reruns "in perpetuity".  In the past, writers were paid on only the first five domestic reruns (they got 140% of their minimum pay scale for that).  They also agreed to create a health and welfare fund.

See also 

 Writers Guild of America, East (WGAE)
 Writers Guild of America, West (WGAW)
 Writers Guild of America Award
 1981 Writers Guild of America strike
 1988 Writers Guild of America strike
 2007–2008 Writers Guild of America strike
 List of Hollywood strikes
 International Affiliation of Writers Guilds

Writers Guild Of America Strike, 1960
Writers Guild of America strike
Writers Guild of America strike
Writers
Writers Guild of America
Entertainment industry labor disputes in the United States